is a song by the Japanese rock band Asian Kung-Fu Generation. The song was initially released on digital streaming platforms on January 18, 2023, with the full single releasing on February 8.The song was used as the 12th opening theme for the anime series, Boruto: Naruto Next Generations.

It is the fourth time the band has provided music for the Naruto franchise, after "Haruka Kanata", "Sore dewa, Mata Ashita", and "Blood Circulator".

On writing a new theme for the series, Gotoh joked in an interview with Billboard that the story has become "more complicated" than when he initially started reading Naruto in Weekly Shonen Jump. He also notes research is key when writing a theme song, and that he had to write this song without knowing the future of the story, though he hoped that "the main characters would overcome these obstacles thrown at them by fate" pointing out that the story would eventually circle back to a face-off between Boruto and Kawaki (which is how the Boruto series begins).

The single has two B-sides, "Weather Report" that sung by their guitarist, Kensuke Kita, and "Nissaka Down Hill" is a continuation of the band's 2008 album Surf Bungaku Kamakura, with tracks named after stations on the Enoshima Electric Railway.

Track listing

Personnel 

 Masafumi Gotoh – lead vocals, rhythm guitar
 Kensuke Kita – lead guitar
 Takahiro Yamada –  bass
 Kiyoshi Ijichi – drums
 Asian Kung-Fu Generation – producer

Charts

Release history

References 

Asian Kung-Fu Generation songs
Songs written by Masafumi Gotoh
Ki/oon Music singles
Anime songs
2023 singles
2023 songs